Kijaszkowo  is a village in the administrative district of Gmina Wysoka, within Piła County, Greater Poland Voivodeship, in west-central Poland.

References

Kijaszkowo